The climate of Paraguay consists of a subtropical climate in the Paranaense region and a tropical climate in the Chaco. The Paranaense region has a humid climate, with abundant rainfall throughout the year and only moderate seasonal changes in temperature.

The seasons in Paraguay are opposite to those in the northern hemisphere, meaning northern summer is Paraguayan winter, and vice versa.

During summer, the dominant influence on the climate is the warm sirocco winds blowing out of the northeast.

During the winter, the dominant wind is the cold pampero from the South Atlantic, which blows across Argentina and is deflected northeastward by the Andes in the southern part of that country. Because of the lack of topographic barriers within Paraguay, these opposite prevailing winds bring about abrupt and irregular changes in the usually moderate weather. Winds are generally brisk. Velocities of  have been reported in southern locations, and the town of Encarnación was once leveled by a tornado.

Paranaense region
The Paranaense region has only two distinct seasons: summer from October to March and winter from May to August.  In transitional months of April and September, temperatures below the midsummer averages include nocturnal minima that may dip below freezing.

Winter 
Temperature varies only insignificantly with latitude. The number of days with temperatures falling below freezing ranges from as few as 3 to as many as 16 yearly, and with even wider variations deep in the interior. Some very mild winters with winds blowing constantly from the north feature little frost.

During a cold winter, however, tongues of Antarctic air bring subfreezing temperatures to all areas. No part of the Paranaense region is entirely free from risk of frost and consequent damage to crops, and various locations report snow flurries occasionally.

Summer 
Moist tropical air keeps the weather warm in the Paranaense region from October through March. In Asunción the temperature averages about  during January, the warmest month.

During the summer, daytime temperatures fairly commonly reach . Frequent waves of cool air from the south, however, cause weather that alternates between clear, humid conditions and storms.

Precipitation

Fairly evenly distributed rain falls in the Paranaense region. Although local meteorological conditions play a contributing role, rain usually falls in dominant tropical air masses. The two periods of maximum precipitation are March through May and October to November.

All subregions may experience considerable variations from year to year.

Chaco

In contrast to the Paranaense region, the Chaco has a tropical wet-and-dry climate bordering on semi-arid. The Chaco experiences seasons that alternately flood and parch the land, yet seasonal variations in temperature are modest. Chaco temperatures are usually high, the temperature drops only slightly in winter. Even at night the air is stifling despite the usually present breezes. Rainfall is light, varying from 500 to 1,000 millimeters (19.7 to 39.4 in) per year, except in the higher land to the northwest where it is somewhat greater. Rainfall is concentrated in the summer months, and extensive areas that are deserts in winter become summer swamps.

Examples

See also
 Geography of Paraguay
 Climate of Argentina
 Climate of Brazil
 Climate of Asunción

References

Paraguay
Geography of Paraguay
Paraguay